The Governor of Samara Oblast is the head of government of Samara Oblast, a federal subject of Russia.

The position was introduced in 1991 as Head of Administration of Samara Oblast. The Governor is elected by direct popular vote for a term of five years and can hold the position for two consecutive terms.

List of officeholders

References 

Politics of Samara Oblast
 
Samara